Spring Lake Outlet is a river located in Cayuga County, New York. It flows into Seneca River by Hard Point, New York.

References

Rivers of Cayuga County, New York
Rivers of New York (state)